Bat Out of Hell may refer to:

Bat Out of Hell, 1977 album by Meat Loaf
"Bat Out of Hell" (song), title song from above album
Bat Out of Hell II: Back into Hell, 1993 album by Meat Loaf
Bat Out of Hell II: Picture Show, 1993 music video by Meat Loaf
Bat Out of Hell III: The Monster Is Loose, 2006 album by Meat Loaf
Bat Out of Hell: Live with the Melbourne Symphony Orchestra, 2004 live album
Bat Out of Hell Tour, 1977-1979 live Meat Loaf tour for promoting of 1977 album
Bat Out of Hell (TV series), 1966 British television series
Bat Out of Hell The Musical, 2017 rock musical written by Jim Steinman
The Mitchell B-25 bomber flown by William G. Farrow during the Doolittle Raid